A grandfather clock (also a longcase clock, tall-case clock, grandfather's clock, or floor clock) is a tall, freestanding, weight-driven pendulum clock with the pendulum held inside the tower or waist of the case. Clocks of this style are commonly 1.8–2.4 metres (6–8 feet) tall with an enclosed pendulum and weights suspended by either cables or chains which have to be calibrated occasionally to keep the proper time. The case often features elaborately carved ornamentation on the hood (or bonnet), which surrounds and frames the dial, or clock face. The English clockmaker William Clement is credited with the development of this form in 1670. Until the early 20th century, pendulum clocks were the world's most accurate timekeeping technology, and longcase clocks, due to their superior accuracy, served as time standards for households and businesses. Today they are kept mainly for their decorative and antique value, having been widely replaced by both analog and  digital timekeeping.

Naming

The Oxford English Dictionary states that the popular 1876 song My Grandfather's Clock is responsible for the common name "grandfather clock" being applied to the longcase clock.

The song was composed by an American songwriter by the name of Henry Clay Work who discovered a longcase clock in The George Hotel in Piercebridge, in County Durham in England. When he asked about the clock, he was informed that it had two owners. After the first owner died the clock became inaccurate and when the second owner died, the clock stopped working altogether. The story inspired Henry to create the song.

Grandfather clocks are of a certain height, usually at least 1.9 metres (6 feet - 3 inches). There are also "grandmother" and "granddaughter" clocks, which are slightly shorter in height.

Origin

The advent of the longcase clock is due to the invention of the anchor escapement mechanism by Robert Hooke around 1658. Prior to the adoption of the anchor mechanism, pendulum clock movements used an older verge escapement mechanism, which required very wide pendulum swings of about 80–100°. Long pendulums with such wide swings could not be fitted within a case, so most freestanding clocks had short pendulums.

The anchor mechanism reduced the pendulum's swing to around 4° to 6°, allowing clockmakers to use longer pendulums, which had slower "beats". These consumed less power allowing clocks to run longer between windings, caused less friction and wear in the movement, and were more accurate. Almost all longcase clocks use a seconds pendulum (also called a "Royal" pendulum) meaning that each swing (or half-period) takes one second. These are about a metre (39 inches) long (to the centre of the bob), requiring a long narrow case. The long narrow case actually predated the anchor clock by a few decades, appearing in clocks in 1660 to allow a long drop for the powering weights. However, once the seconds pendulum began to be used, this long weight case proved perfect to house it as well. 

British clockmaker William Clement, who disputed credit for the anchor escapement with Robert Hooke, made the first longcase clocks by 1680.  Later the same year, Thomas Tompion, the most prominent British clockmaker, was making them too. Longcase clocks spread rapidly from England to other European countries and Asia.

The first longcase clocks, like all clocks prior to the anchor escapement, had only one hand; an hour hand. The increased accuracy made possible by the anchor motivated the addition of the minute hand to clock faces in the next few decades.

Between 1680 and 1800, the average price of a grandfather clock in England remained steady at £1 10s. In 1680, this was the amount paid by an average working family for a year's rent, so the purchase of clocks was confined to the relatively well-off. But by 1800 wages had increased enough so that many lower middle class households owned grandfather clocks.

Modern longcase clocks use a more accurate variation of the anchor escapement called the deadbeat escapement.

Description

Traditionally, longcase clocks were made with two types of movement: eight-day and one-day (30-hour) movements. A clock with an eight-day movement required winding only once a week, while generally less-expensive 30-hour clocks had to be wound every day. Eight-day clocks are often driven by two weights – one driving the pendulum and the other the striking mechanism, which usually consisted of a bell or chimes. Such movements usually have two keyholes, one on each side of the dial to wind each one. By contrast, 30-hour clocks often had a single weight to drive both the timekeeping and striking mechanisms. Some 30-hour clocks were made with false keyholes, for customers who wished that guests to their home would think that the household was able to afford the more expensive eight-day clock. All modern striking longcase clocks have eight-day mechanical quarter chiming and full hour striking movements. Most longcase clocks are cable-driven, meaning that the weights are suspended by cables. If the cable were attached directly to the weight, the load would cause rotation and untwist the cable strands, so the cable wraps around a pulley mounted to the top of each weight. The mechanical advantage of this arrangement also doubles the running time allowed by a given weight drop.

Cable clocks are wound by inserting a special crank (called a "key") into holes in the clock's face and turning it. Others, however, are chain-driven, meaning that the weights are suspended by chains that wrap around gears in the clock's mechanism, with the other end of the chain hanging down next to the weight. To wind a chain-driven longcase clock, one pulls on the end of each chain, lifting the weights until the weights come up to just under the clock's face.

Elaborate striking sequences
In the early 20th century, quarter-hour chime sequences were added to longcase clocks. At the top of each hour, the full chime sequence sounds, immediately followed by the hour strike. At 15 minutes after each hour, 1/4 of the chime sequence plays, at the bottom of each hour, 1/2 of the chime sequence plays, and at 15 minutes before each hour, 3/4 of the chime sequence plays. The chime tune used in almost all longcase clocks is Westminster Quarters. Many also offer the option of Whittington chimes or St. Michael's chimes, selectable by a switch mounted on the right side of the dial, which also allows one to silence the chimes if desired. As a result of adding chime sequences, all modern mechanical longcase clocks have three weights instead of just two. The left weight provides power for the hour strike, the middle weight provides power for the clock's pendulum and general timekeeping functions, while the right weight provides power for the quarter-hour chime sequences.

Types

Comtoise
Comtoise clocks, also known as Morbier clocks or Morez clocks, are a style of longcase clock made in the French region Franche-Comté (hence their name). Features distinguishing this style are a curving "potbellied" case and a greater use of curved lines. Often a heavy, elongated, highly ornamented pendulum bob extends up the case (see photo).

Production of these clocks began in 1680 and continued for a period of about 230 years. During the peak production years (1850–1890) over 60,000 clocks were made each year. These clocks were very popular across the generations; they kept the time on farms throughout France. Many Comtoise clocks can be found in France but they are also frequently found in Spain, Germany, and other parts of Europe, less in the United States. Many Comtoise clocks were also exported to other countries in Europe and even farther, to the Ottoman Empire and as far as Thailand. The metal mechanism was usually protected by a wooden sheath.

Bornholm and Mora

Bornholm clocks are Danish longcase clocks and were made on Bornholm from 1745 to 1900. In Sweden a special variety of longcase clocks was made in Mora, called Mora clocks.

Bornholm clock-making began in the 1740s when an English ship, which had longcase clocks in its hold, was stranded. They were sent for repair to a turner named Poul Ottesen Arboe in Rønne and as a result of his repair of them he learned enough about clocks to begin to make his own.

Historical manufacturers

British
John Alker or Alker of Wigan, Lancashire
Allam & Clements
Samuel Ashton, Ashbourne
William Barrow, London
Bilbie family, Somerset
Thomas Birchall Nantwich, Cheshire
Peter Bower, Redlynch, Wiltshire
Joseph Bowles, Winbourne (i.e.: Wimbourne), Dorset; active 1791
Samuel Bowles, Wimbourne, Dorset
Robert Bryson, Edinburgh
William Bucknall, Burslem (Stoke-on-Trent)
Thomas Bullock, Bath, Somerset
Samuel Buxton, Diss, Norfolk
John Calver, Woodbridge, Suffolk
Thomas Cartwright
John Clement & Son (Tring, Hertfordshire)
Thomas Dobbie, Gorbals, Glasgow
Richard Donisthorp (fl. 1797), of Loughborough
Matthew & Thomas Dutton
Peter Fearnley, Wigan
John Fernhill, Wrexham
Thomas Hackney, London, c. 1700–1750
Edward Harrison, Warrington
John Harrison, Wakefield/Barrow upon Humber/London
Nathaniel Hedge, Colchester, Essex
Holmes
James Howden, Edinburgh
Thomas Husband, Hull
Thomas Johnson
John Knibb, Oxford and London
Joseph Knibb, Oxford and London
William Lassell (1758–1790), Toxteth Park, Liverpool
Timothy Mason Gainsborough, Lincolnshire
Alexander Miller, Montrose
Peddie, Stirling, Scotland
Daniel Quare
Thomas Ross, Hull
John Snelling, Alton
John Trubshaw, London
Warry, Bristol
James Woolley Codnor
Thomas Worswick, Lancaster
Thomas Wright
Henry Young, Swaffham, Norfolk
John Wyld, Nottingham
Stephen Harris, Tonbridge

Irish
W Egan & Sons, Cork
Ezekiel Bullock, Lurgan
Alexander Gordon, Dublin

Finnish
Masters of Könni Könnin mestarit (1757–1865), Ilmajoki
 Finnish Museum of Horology is master of Jaakko Könni manufactured table clocks and pocket watches
 Ilmajoki Museum is Masters of Könni manufactured horse vehicles, clocks, looms, locks, tools, machine of gear "keervärkki"

Americans
Ansonia Clock Company (1851–2006), Ansonia, Connecticut and Brooklyn, New York
Benjamin Bagnall (1689–1773), Boston
Aaron Brokaw (1768–1853), Bridge Town, New Jersey
Isaac Brokaw (1746–1826), Bridge Town, New Jersey
Silas Merriman (1733–1805), New Haven, Connecticut
Aaron Miller ( –1778), Elizabeth Township, New Jersey
Luman Watson (1790–1834), Cincinnati
Simon Willard (1753–1848), Roxbury, Massachusetts
Zachariah Grandfather Clocks (1975–1987), Chicago, Illinois

Australian casemaker
Harry Williams – Oxford Cabinet Company Pty Ltd (1946–1961), Granville, New South Wales, Australia

Current manufacturers
Hermle Clocks – Amherst VA
Howard Miller Clock Company – Zeeland MI
Ridgeway Clocks (owned now by Howard Miller Clock Co.)
Novellon Clocks – India

References

External links

Clock designs
Longcase clocks